The Orchestra Invisibile (Invisible Orchestra) is an Italian band formed in 2005 in Cascina Rossago (PV, Italy), the first Italian farm community designed to meet the needs and unfold possibilities of young adults with autism.

History
The original group, formed by the first guests of Cascina Rossago and some students, trainee psychiatrists and professors of the University of Pavia, has grown to the actual number of 25 components, 12 of them affected by autism. The band counts 14 percussionists, 5 saxophonist, 3 trumpeters, 3 trombonists, one tuba player and a double-bass player, with several pianists. The term invisibile (invisible) refers to a feature of the group: the need to restrain the visibility of the musicians, to minimize distress for the more sensitive components, which could find the presence of an audience difficult to tolerate. Nevertheless, the Orchestra Invisibile appeared in public and performed live in theatres (Torino, Pavia, and Tortona, and Viterbo. Yet, the communicative exchanges within the band are mainly non-verbal. The majority of the Orchestra Invisibile's repertoire is jazz mainstream. The experience has shown how this musical genre could be a good compromise between the consistency of the harmonic structures and the changes deriving from the improvisation and the spirit of freedom, characteristic features of jazz. This can be heard in their first album Orchestra Invisibile, live 2012, published by the independent label Etichette Invisibili. This would sound like an off-key and uncoordinated group in the beginning that gradually harmonizes and synchronizes reaching a pleasant ensemble towards the end. The only way to assist the rehearsals is to actively participate by playing. This aspect has promoted the collaboration with famous musicians as Ellade Bandini (drummers for Paolo Conte, Fabrizio De André, Francesco Guccini, Mina and many more), Jorge Alberto Guerrero and Claudio Perelli.
Another critical feature of the band is the circular setting, both during rehearsals and live concerts, alternating melodic and rhythmic instruments, consistently with the sameness during the weekly rehearsals and the performance on stage. This disposition aims at improving the communication within the band, facilitating the visual contact. From the talent of Simona Concaro, and thanks to the contribution of the international musician Hanna Shybayeva, the album Playing with Autism 1.0 (Etichette Invisibili, INVI1301) and the book Playing with Autism 1.1 - Encountering Simona Concaro by Her Music (PUP 2014) have recently been published. Simona Concaro's executions have further been recorded in Playing with Autism 2.0 (Etichette Invisibili, INVI1401).
In 2015 it was published the photographic book Orchestra Invisibile (Jaca Book 2015). Celebrating the ten years of activity, the Orchestra Invisibile performed two live concerts at the Teatro Municipale of Casale Monferrato (AL, Italy) and at the Auditorium of the Istituto Vittadini of Pavia (Italy). Furthermore, Edizioni Cardano of Pavia published the book Ritratti Invisibili as a gift for the percussionists of the band.
In 2016 the Orchestra Invisibile took part at the Caffeina Festival in Viterbo, gaining the favour of both audience and critics. In 2017, in the context of the World Autism Awareness Day, the Orchestra played at the auditorium Tiziano Zalli of the Banca Popolare di Lodi, designed by Renzo Piano. The performance has been recorded and published in Orchestra Invisibile Live 2017 (Etichette Invisibili, INVI1701) along with a videoclip about the Orchestra Invisibile directed by Giorgia Soi with the contribution of Rossana De Michele. The Orchestra Invisibile also closed the second edition of the Festival Gli stati della Mente, in Vicenza (2018)  and opened the Resilience Symposium 2019 at the University of Bologna. In December 6, 2019 the Orchestra Invisibile, celebrating its 15th Cristmass, interpreted the Sinfonia degli Arrivi, welcoming during the performance the arrival of several new musicians.

Active components 

	Gianfranco Ciavarella, Stefano Damiani, Mariacristina Migliardi, Claudio Perelli: sax
	Enrico Pozzato, Umberto Provenzani, Walter Vitullo: trumpet
	Cecilia Guiot: french horn, vocalist
	Laura Fusar-Poli, Pierluigi Politi, Matteo Rocchetti: trombone
	Alice Mandrini, Filippo Besana: guitar
	Simona Concaro, Pierluigi Politi: piano
	Marco Vercesi, Vincenzo Arienti: bass
	Salvatore Alberghina, Annalisa Aquilano, Ellade Bandini, Giovanni Barale, Marcos Beretta, Federico Campi, Dario Caporaso, Federico Carini, Erminia Casciaro, Claudia Castiglioni, Simona Concaro, Elena Croci, Elisa Guarrera, Alice Mandrini, Cristiano Ravasini, Francesca Spagnuolo, Paolo Rovelli, Andrea Tomaselli, Tiziano Vaghi, Igor Vecchi: percussions

Have played with the ‘’Orchestra Invisibile’’ 
	Roberto Aglieri
	Francesca Ajmar
	Alessio Alogna
	Noemi Ancona
	Bernardo Aroztegui
	Giuliana Bagnasco
	David Ruben Barbaglia
	Andrea Bassi
	Maria Besozzi
	Giulia Bianchi
	Ilaria Bonoldi
	Anna Maria Bordin
	Marianna Boso
	Domenico Brignone
	Davide Broglia
	Marcella Cambianica
	Antonella Caputo
	Vincenzo Caracciolo
	Walter Casali
	Alessandra Comai
	Massimiliano Confalonieri
	Oliviero Cremonesi
	Marta Crippa
	Silvia Cucchi
	Mariarosa D'Amico
	Davide Donatellis
	Elodie Favre
	Andrea Ferrario
	Fulvio Ferraris
	Manuela Filippa
	Giulia Gaggero
	Corrado Garbazza
	Lorenzo Giapparize
	Leonardo Graffeo
	Jorge Alberto Guerrero
	Ike Hasbani
	Rosario Ippolito
	Amy Loan
	Filippo Mampreso
	Lara Mancini
	Tito Mangialajo Rantzer
	Giovanni Marchese
	Mara Marini
	Alessandro Minutillo
	Alessia Mori
	Elisabetta Napoli
	Gabriele Naretto
	Elena Nobile
	Lucrezia Oliver
	Paki Panunzio
	Filippo Perelli
	Marianna Pinto
	Francesca Podavini
	Viviana Ponta
	Enrico Pozzo
	Adriano Primadei
	Alessandra Ramati
	Andrea Randon
	Livio Ravetta
	Elena Rho
	Veronica Riva
	Cristian Rossotti
	Alberto Rovelli
	Chiara Salvottini
	Marco Sannella
	Alberto Scanarotti
	Simona Schiatti
	Hanna Shybayeva
	Teobaldo Soldà
	Cecilia Spallarossa
	Piero Tana
	Sara Targa
	Luigi Tomaselli
	Tobia Veglia
	Anne-Marie Wille

Discography

Albums
 2012 - “Orchestra Invisibile live 2012” (Etichette Invisibili, INVI1201)
 2013 - "Playing with Autism 1.0" (Etichette Invisibili, INVI1301)
 2014 - "Playing with Autism 2.0" (Etichette Invisibili, INVI1401)
 2017 - "Orchestra Invisibile live 2017" (Etichette Invisibili, INVI1701)

Bibliography

References

External links 
	Official website
	Bonoldi, I., Emanuele, E., & Politi, P. (2009). A piano composer with low-functioning severe autism. Acta Neuropsychiatrica, 21(1), 2-3.
	Fusar-Poli, L., Rocchetti, M., Garda, M., Politi, P. (2016). 'Aut'-sider: the invisible talent of Simona Concaro. Epidemiol Psychiatr Sci. 26(2):1-3.

Autism-related organizations
Italian orchestras
Music therapy